Ricky Wayne Blanton (born April 21, 1966) is a retired American professional basketball player who was selected by the National Basketball Association's Phoenix Suns in the 2nd round (46th overall) of the 1989 NBA Draft. A 6'7" and 215 lb forward/center from Louisiana State University, Blanton signed a 10-day contract and played in only two career NBA games for Chicago Bulls during the 1992–93 season in 18 point wins against the Sacramento Kings on Feb 15, 1993 and Utah Jazz on Feb 17, 1993 at the Chicago Stadium.

Blanton played in the 1986 Final Four as a member of the LSU Tigers.

Coaching career
After coaching stints at LSU and Utah State, Blanton served as head men's basketball coach at Nicholls State University in Thibodaux, Louisiana from 2002 to 2004. He resigned shortly before the 2004–05 season.

Head coaching record

Broadcasting career
Blanton served as the color analyst for the LSU Tigers basketball team from the 2009–2010 season through the 2016–2017 season.

References

External links

1966 births
Living people
American expatriate basketball people in Argentina
American expatriate basketball people in France
American expatriate basketball people in Italy
American men's basketball coaches
American men's basketball players
Basketball coaches from Florida
Basketball players from Miami
Chicago Bulls players
College men's basketball head coaches in the United States
Grand Rapids Hoops players
LSU Tigers basketball announcers
LSU Tigers basketball coaches
LSU Tigers basketball players
Nicholls Colonels men's basketball coaches
Phoenix Suns draft picks
Rapid City Thrillers players
Sioux Falls Skyforce (CBA) players
Small forwards
Utah State Aggies men's basketball coaches
Wichita Falls Texans players
Sports coaches from Miami